Clifford Trevelyan Cocks (29 November 1883 – 6 April 1974) was an Australian rules footballer for . He captained the club in 1912.

References

1883 births
1974 deaths
Port Adelaide Football Club (SANFL) players
Port Adelaide Football Club players (all competitions)
Australian rules footballers from South Australia